James S. Stewart (1791–1863) was a Scottish engraver and painter.

Life
He was born at Edinburgh in October or November 1791. He was articled to Robert Scott the engraver, and had as his helpful fellow pupil John Burnet. He also studied drawing in the Trustees' Academy. On the foundation of the Royal Scottish Academy in 1826 he became an original member. In Edinburgh he lived at 4 Hermitage Place, a narrow street in Stockbridge renamed Raeburn Street in 1922 following Edinburgh absorbing Leith in 1920 which already had a Hermitage Place.

In 1830 Stewart moved to London. In 1833 he was induced by financial troubles to emigrate to Cape Colony; there he settled as a farmer, but within a year lost everything through the outbreak of the Sixth Xhosa War. He then went to reside in the town of Somerset East. Teaching and painting portraits, he earned enough to purchase another property. He subsequently became a magistrate and a member of the legislature, and died in the colony in May 1863.

Works
Stewart's first independent plate was from Sir William Allan's Tartar Robbers dividing the Spoil,’ which was followed by Circassian Captives (1820); The Murder of Archbishop Sharpe, (1824); and Queen Mary signing her Abdication, all from paintings by Allan. He then became associated with David Wilkie, for whom he executed, with other works, a plate of the Penny Wedding.

In London he engraved The Pedlar, after Wilkie, and Hide and Seek, from a picture painted by himself in the style of Wilkie, which was exhibited at the British Institution in 1829.

External link
An engraving of James Inskipp's painting,  for The Amulet annual for 1831 with illustrative verse by Letitia Elizabeth Landon.

References

Attribution

1791 births
1863 deaths
19th-century engravers
Scottish engravers
Alumni of the Edinburgh College of Art
19th-century Scottish painters